Chicago Park (formerly: Storms Station) is a residential and unincorporated historic agricultural  community in Nevada County, California. It is located along Highway 174, with its center at the intersection of Mt. Olive Road. The neighborhood gets its name from its founding residents, who came from Chicago to California in the late 1800s to grow fruit, which was often shipped back to Illinois for consumption. Chicago Park is about 9 miles southeast of Grass Valley and about 3 miles north of Colfax.

History

The Early Days of Storms Station 
Prior to the 1840s, this area was populated by the Nisenan, sometimes referred to as Southern Maidu. Emigrants to California then began to arrive. In August 1849, what is reported to have been Nevada County's second store was erected by a Mr. Findley on land overlooking the junction of the Bear River and Greenhorn Creek. One of the earliest settlers was Simmon P. Storms, who developed a ranch which, among other things, hosted sporting events such as wrestling matches and bear fights. A local newspaper reported "If you wish to seek a pleasant locality for spending the day, where after a good ride over a smooth road, where you can enjoy a cool and delightful lounge and excellent dinner, go to Storms."

In 1854, area residents led by Mr. Storms succeeded in having the Nisenan removed to a reservation near Tehama, California. During that period, Benjamin Taylor settled on a ranch in the area which he named Buena Vista, after the Mexican War battle in which he had participated, and engaged in farming and horse breeding. Others who settled in the area, such as the Louis Orzalli family, found it very suitable for growing fruit, especially pears. Joseph Shebley established a fish hatchery and picnic grounds. In 1883, he sold the hatchery to the California Fish Commission which abandoned it a few years later. Mr. Ambergh established a brewery. Gold mining was also prevalent.

The Railroad Arrives 
In 1872, the Coleman Brothers purchased the Buena Vista and Storms ranches, and other properties in the area, as they were developing the Nevada County Narrow Gauge Railroad, known affectionately as the "Never Come Never Go."  Completed in 1876, the Railroad connected the area to the transcontinental railroad at Colfax, spurring its agricultural development. Among other things, the Colemans established a saw mill and cleared land of trees to build the Railroad and to feed the Railroad's steam locomotives. Stations in the area were established at Storms Ranch, just south of present Lakewood Lane; at Buena Vista, just south of the present intersection of You Bet Road and Highway 174; and at Peardale. The Railroad provided a good means of transporting agricultural products to market. Still standing at the intersection of Mount Olive and Lower Colfax Roads is the Pacific Fruit Packing Shed, built in 1930 alongside the railroad tracks, to replace an earlier shed which collapsed in a snowstorm.

The Railroad also brought people to Chicago Park for recreation at sites such as Shebley's Pond. In 1908, the Railroad was rerouted to run directly through Chicago Park, causing the Chicago Park station to be relocated close to where the packing shed now stands.  The Railroad was discontinued in the 1940s and the bridge across the Bear River was removed in 1963 to make way for Rollins Dam.

The Chicago Park Colony 
In 1887, a group of Colfax and Chicago, Illinois developers led by Mssrs. Lobner, Hayford, Stafford, Briot and Porter, acquired several thousand acres of land and drew up plans for the Chicago Park Colony. The Colony was to consist of 20 and 40 acre tracts as well as town lots laid out around a public square with streets named for prominent streets in Chicago. Much of the planned development never materialized, but reportedly almost 7000 acres were sold, principally to residents of Chicago. Many of the colonizers found the weather too cold, given their expectations fueled by advertisements of sunny California. Many of the tracts were planted with orchards, and the area was referred to as the Bartlett Pear Belt.

The railroad station at Storms Station was renamed Chicago Park Station.

One of the original developers, Dr. Charles A. Pusheck built a sanitarium and hotel in the Orchards Springs area of Chicago Park. It burned down in 1924 He and his mother were also instrumental in the founding of St. Paul Lutheran Church in 1904. Chicago Park also had a Catholic church.

A post office was established at the railroad station in 1888, with Joseph H. Hubacheck as postmaster.  It moved into the Chicago Park Store when it was erected in 1915. In 1897 a schoolhouse was built.< Telephone service, initially to Colfax, arrived in 1905. PG&E electric power arrived in 1930.

Agriculture 
Fruit was king in the area for about 100 years. Orchards growing pears, plums, peaches and apples were everywhere. Because water was not abundant, dry farming techniques were mastered which improved fruit color. Reportedly, pears from Chicago Park fetched twice the price as pears from the Central Valley. In 1915, J.F. Siems' local Bartlett pears were honored at the Pacific International Exposition in San Francisco. As the 20th century progressed, pear blight appeared, causing some growers to switch to other crops.

The Bierwagens are one of the prominent area farming families. In 1904, William Bierwagen bought much of the Storms Ranch.> His nephew Ernie (1915–2004) was a leader in the local agricultural community. The Bierwagen family continues to grow apples and other fruit on the family farm in Chicago Park.

Chicago Park Today 

Today, Chicago Park is a pleasant agricultural residential community. In recent times, a new school, post office, and fire station have been constructed. In addition to several private grape growers, a formal winery was established in 2000. Of historical significance are the Chicago Park store, the old schoolhouse, the St. Paul cemetery and the packing shed erected in the 1930s. Rollins Lake, hiking, and a number of fruit farms, including the Bierwagen Donner Trail Fruit Farm, in operation since 1902, draw visitors to the area. The only remaining evidence of the Railroad are the flattened areas where the track used to lie.

References

Sources 
 (electronic edition)

External links 
 Chicago Park Elementary School District
 Chicago Park Fire District

Unincorporated communities in California
Unincorporated communities in Nevada County, California